Barberino may refer to places in the Metropolitan City of Florence, Tuscany, Italy:

Barberino di Mugello, a municipality
Barberino Tavarnelle, a municipality
Barberino Val d'Elsa, a frazione of Barberino Tavarnelle

See also
Barbero (disambiguation)
Barberini (disambiguation)